The Colquitt Town Square Historic District in Colquitt, Georgia is a  historic district that included 35 contributing buildings when it was listed on the National Register of Historic Places in 1983.  The district includes the historic courthouse square and buildings on all four sides of it.

The original, historic courthouse was destroyed by fire in the 1970s, and a replacement courthouse, the Miller County Courthouse stands in its stead, on the square.  This courthouse does not itself contribute to the history of the district.

References

Historic districts on the National Register of Historic Places in Georgia (U.S. state)
Victorian architecture in Georgia (U.S. state)
Buildings and structures completed in 1902
Miller County, Georgia
Buildings designated early commercial in the National Register of Historic Places